This is a list of Palm OS devices, and companies that make, or have made, them.

Abacus/Fossil, Inc.
Fossil, made Wrist PDAs that use the Palm OS operating system.(Discontinued)

AU5005—Palm OS 4.1
AU5006—Palm OS 4.1
AU5008—Palm OS 4.1
FX2001—Palm OS 4.1
FX2008—Palm OS 4.1
FX2009—Palm OS 4.1

Aceeca
Meazura—Palm OS 4.1.2
PDA32—Garnet OS 5.4

Acer
S10/S11/S12—Palm OS 4.1 - first Chinese Palm
S50/S55—Palm OS 4.1, color Hi-Res screen
S60/S65—Palm OS 4.1, MP3 player, voice recorder, color Hi-Res screen

AlphaSmart
Dana—Palm OS 4.1.2 - small "laptop" running Palm OS with a 560x160 pixel greyscale LCD, full-sized keyboard, two SD card slots, 8MiB or 16Mib memory, powered by NiMH or 3 x AA battery or wall adapter
 Dana Wireless—Palm OS 4.1.2, same features as Dana plus Wi-Fi, 16MiB memory, SDIO support, widescreen launcher

Garmin
PDA with integrated GPS.

iQue 3600a—Palm OS 5.4
iQue 3600—Palm OS 5.2.1
iQue 3200—Palm OS 5.2.1
iQue 3000—Palm OS 5.2.1

Group Sense PDA
Smartphones with Palm OS 

Xplore G18—Palm OS 4.1 (candybar, 2.2" 176x240 16-bit TFT, CIF camera, Dragonball VZ 33 MHz, 16MB RAM, 4MB OS flash)
Xplore G88—Palm OS 4.1 (slider, 2.2" 176x240 16-bit TFT, CIF camera, Dragonball VZ 33 MHz, 16MB RAM, 4MB OS flash, 24MB user flash appearing as an internal SD card)
Xplore M28—Palm OS 5.4 (slider, 2.2" 176x240 16-bit TFT, VGA camera, ARM9 CPU, 32MB NVFS storage, SD/MMC card slot)
Xplore M68—Palm OS 5.4 (candybar, 2.2" 176x240 16-bit TFT, 1.3MP camera, ARM9 CPU, SD/MMC card slot)
Xplore M70—Palm OS 5.4 (candybar, 2.2" 176x240 16-bit TFT, 1.3MP camera with video recording, ARM9 CPU, SD/MMC card slot)
Xplore M70S—Palm OS 5.4 hardware same as M70 with security firmware update
Xplore M98—Palm OS 5.4 (flip, 2.2" 176x240 16-bit TFT inside, 96x96 outside, 1.3MP camera, ARM9 CPU, 32MB NVFS storage, microSD card slot)

Handera/TRG
TRGpro—Palm OS 3.5.3 - introduced standard (CF) Card slot (company was at that time TRG (Technology Resource Group))
Handera 330—Palm OS 3.5.3
Handera 330c— never released

Handspring
The inventors of the Palm formed a new company called Handspring in June 1998,  operating until 2003 when it merged with Palm, Inc.'s hardware division.

Visor 
Visors introduced color cases and the Springboard Expansion slot.

Visor Solo—Palm OS 3.1H  -  16 MHz, 2 MB RAM, B&W
Visor Deluxe—Palm OS 3.1H/H2  -  20 MHz, 8MB RAM, B&W
Visor Platinum—Palm OS 3.5.2H  -  33 MHz, 8 MB RAM, B&W
Visor Prism—Palm OS 3.5.2H3  -  33 MHz, 8 MB RAM, color (world's first 16-bit color Palm OS device)
Visor Edge—Palm OS 3.5.2H  -  33 MHz, 8 MB RAM, B&W, thin, sleek, metal case
Visor Neo—Palm OS 3.5.2H3  -  33 MHz, 8 MB RAM, B&W
Visor Pro—Palm OS 3.5.2H3  -  33 MHz, 16 MB RAM, B&W

Treo
Smartphones (except 90)

Treo 90—Palm OS 4.1H  -  can be updated to 4.1H3 which adds SDIO support
Treo 180—Palm OS 3.5.2H
Treo 180g—Palm OS 3.5.2H  -  the Treo 180 with Graffiti area, rather than a keyboard
Treo 270—Palm OS 3.5.2H
Treo 300—Palm OS 3.5.2H6.2
Treo 600—Palm OS 5.2.1H

IBM

IBM's Workpad series was nearly identical to PDAs manufactured by Palm. The main difference were color and logo on the casing.

WorkPad
WorkPad (rebadged PalmPilot)
WorkPad 20X (rebadged Palm III)
WorkPad 30X (rebadged Palm IIIx)
WorkPad c3 (rebadged Palm V/Vx) thin, sleek, metal case
WorkPad c500 (rebadged Palm m500) thin, sleek, metal case
WorkPad c505 (rebadged Palm m505) thin, sleek, metal case

Janam
XP20—Palm OS 5.4.9, B&W 160x160 screen, two variants: one with a full keyboard, one with partial
XP30—Palm OS 5.4.9, Color 240x160 screen, two variants: one with a full keyboard, one with partial

Kyocera
Smartphones
QCP-6035—Palm OS 3.5.3
QCP-7135—Palm OS 4.1

Legend Group
Pam 168—Palm OS 4.1

Lenovo
Chinese PDAs

p100—Palm OS 5.3
p200—Palm OS 5.3
p300—Palm OS 5.3

Palm, Inc. & palmOne, Inc.

Pilot 1000 (as division of U.S. Robotics)—Palm OS 1.0  -  16 MHz, 128 KB RAM
Pilot 5000 (as division of U.S. Robotics)—Palm OS 1.0  -  16 MHz, 512 KB RAM
PalmPilot Personal (as division of U.S. Robotics)—Palm OS 2.0  -  16 MHz, 512 KB RAM, backlight
PalmPilot Professional (as division of U.S. Robotics)—Palm OS 2.0  -  16 MHz, 1 MB RAM, backlight
Palm III—Palm OS 3.0  -  16 MHz, 2 MB RAM  (update possible to 3.5.3 (website) or 4.1 (CD))
Palm IIIx—Palm OS 3.1  -  16 MHz, 4 MB RAM  (update possible to 3.5.3 (website) or 4.1 (CD))
Palm V—Palm OS 3.1  -  16 MHz, 2 MB RAM, thin, sleek, metal case  (update possible to 3.5.3 (website) or 4.1 (CD))
Palm VII—Palm OS 3.2  -  16 MHz, 2 MB RAM, Palm.net wireless
Palm IIIe—Palm OS 3.1  -  16 MHz, 2 MB RAM, no flash OS upgrade
Palm Vx—Palm OS 3.3  -  20 MHz, 8MB RAM, thin, sleek, metal case  (update possible to 3.5.3 (website) or 4.1 (CD))
Palm IIIxe—Palm OS 3.5  -  16 MHz, 8 MB RAM  (update possible to 3.5.3 (website) or 4.1 (CD))
Palm IIIc—Palm OS 3.5  -  20 MHz, 8 MB RAM, Palm's first color screen (8-bit)  (update possible to 3.5.3 (website) or 4.1 (CD))
Palm VIIx—Palm OS 3.5  -  20 MHz, 8 MB RAM, Palm.net wireless
Palm m100—Palm OS 3.5  -  16 MHz, 2 MB RAM
Palm m105—Palm OS 3.5  -  16 MHz, 8 MB RAM
Palm m500—Palm OS 4.0  -  33 MHz, 8 MB RAM, thin, sleek, metal case  (update possible to 4.1 (website)) 
Palm m505—Palm OS 4.0  -  33 MHz, 8 MB RAM, 16-bit color screen, thin, sleek, metal case  (update possible to 4.1 (website)) 
Palm m125—Palm OS 4.0.1  -  33 MHz, 8 MB RAM
Palm i705—Palm OS 4.1  -  33 MHz, 8 MB RAM, Palm.net wireless
Palm m130—Palm OS 4.1  -  33 MHz, 8 MB RAM, 12-bit color screen 
Palm m515—Palm OS 4.1  -  33 MHz, 16 MB RAM, 16-bit color screen, thin, sleek, metal case

Zire
The Zire series, renamed "Z" series in 2005, are the lower-end Palm models. Some have color screens (160x160 or 320x320), some are B&W (160x160). 

Zire (also known as m150)—Palm OS 4.1  -  16 MHz, 2 MB RAM
Zire 71—Palm OS 5.2.1  -  144 MHz, 16 MB RAM, 0.3MP digital camera, MP3 player
Zire 21—Palm OS 5.2.1  -  126 MHz, 8 MB RAM, new PIM
Zire 31—Palm OS 5.2.8  -  200 MHz, 16 MB RAM, new PIM, MP3 player
Zire 72 & 72s—Palm OS 5.2.8  -  312 MHz, 32 MB RAM, new PIM, 1.2MP digital camera with video, voice recorder, MP3 player, Bluetooth
Palm Z22—Palm OS 5.4.9  -  200 MHz, 32 MB RAM, new PIM, NVFS

Tungsten
The Tungsten series, renamed "T" series in 2005, are the high-end Palm models, with ARM/RISC processors (except the Tungsten W), high-resolution color screens, and SD memory cards.

 Tungsten T (also known as m550)—Palm OS 5.0  -  144 MHz, 16 MHz, sliding case, voice recorder, Bluetooth
 Tungsten W—Palm OS 4.1.1  -  33 MHz, 16 MB RAM, physical keyboard, cell service  (update possible to 4.1.2 (website))
 Tungsten C—Palm OS 5.2.1  -  400 MHz, 64 MB RAM, physical keyboard, voice recorder, WiFi
 Tungsten T2—Palm OS 5.2.1  -  144 MHz, 32 MB RAM, voice recorder, Bluetooth
 Tungsten E—Palm OS 5.2.1  -  126 MHz, 32 MB RAM, new PIM
 Tungsten T3—Palm OS 5.2.1  -  400 MHz, 64 MB RAM, new PIM, sliding case, voice recorder, MP3 player, Bluetooth
 Tungsten T5—Palm OS 5.4.0  -   416 MHz, 256 MB RAM, new PIM, NVFS, internal USB flash drive, MP3 player, Bluetooth  (update possible to 5.4.8 (website)) 
 Tungsten E2—Palm OS 5.4.7  -  200 MHz, 32 MB RAM, new PIM, NVFS, Bluetooth, MP3 player
 Palm TX—Palm OS 5.4.9  -  312 MHz, 128 MB RAM, new PIM, NVFS, MP3 player, WiFi, Bluetooth

LifeDrive 
LifeDrive—Palm OS 5.4.8  -  416 MHz, 64 MB RAM, 4 GB Microdrive, new PIM, NVFS, voice recorder, MP3 player, WiFi, Bluetooth

Treo
The Treo series are combo cell phones/PDA models, originally developed by Handspring.
Treo 600—Palm OS 5.2.1H (The first models were "Handspring"-branded, later models were "Palm"-branded.)
Treo 650—Palm OS 5.4, 5.4.5 or 5.4.8 depending on specific carrier version
Treo 680—Palm OS 5.4.9
Treo 700p—Palm OS 5.4.9
Treo 755p—Palm OS 5.4.9

Centro 
The Palm Centro is a combo cell phone/PDA, similar to the Treo line.

 Centro—Palm OS 5.4.9

Qool
QDA 700—Palm OS 5.4.1 - Cell Phone

Qualcomm
Smartphones, later sold to Kyocera
pdQ 1900 (single-mode CDMA 1900 MHz digital PCS)—Palm OS 3.0
pdQ 800 (dual-mode 800 MHz digital/analog PCS)—Palm OS 3.0

Samsung
Smartphones

SPH-i300—Palm OS 3.5
SPH-i330—Palm OS 3.5.3
SCH-M330—Palm OS 3.5.3 -  Scheduled for release in South Korea
SPH-i500—Palm OS 4.1
SPH-i550—Palm OS 5.2 - never released.
SCH-M500—Palm OS 5.2 -  Scheduled for release in South Korea in mid-July 2004.
SGH-i500—Palm OS 5.2 - never released
SGH-i505—Palm OS 5.2 - never released
SGH-i530—Palm OS 5.2 - never sold, only given away at Athens Olympics 2004
SCH-i539—Palm OS 5.4.1 - Released in China

Sony CLIÉ

Sony developed and marketed the CLIÉ multimedia PDA from 2000 to 2005.

N Series

PEG-N610C—Palm OS 4.0
PEG-N710C—Palm OS 3.5.2
PEG-N760C—Palm OS 4.1S & MP3 player

NR Series

PEG-NR70—Palm OS 4.1S
PEG-NR70V—Palm OS 4.1S

NX Series

PEG-NX60—Palm OS 5.0 & MP3 player
PEG-NX70V—Palm OS 5.0 & MP3 player & VGA digi-cam / camcorder
PEG-NX73V—Palm OS 5.0 & MP3 player & VGA digi-cam / camcorder (/E European versions also had Bluetooth)
PEG-NX80V—Palm OS 5.0 & MP3 player & 1.3 Mp digi-cam / camcorder

NZ Series

PEG-NZ90—Palm OS 5.0 & MP3 player & 2 Mp digi-cam / camcorder

S Series

PEG-S300—Palm OS 3.5S
PEG-S320—Palm OS 4.0S
PEG-S360—Palm OS 4.0S
PEG-S500C—Palm OS 3.5S

SJ Series

PEG-SJ20—Palm OS 4.1
PEG-SJ22—Palm OS 4.1
PEG-SJ30—Palm OS 4.1
PEG-SJ33—Palm OS 4.1

SL Series

PEG-SL10—Palm OS 4.1 & B&W paper-white screen

T Series

PEG-T400—Palm OS 4.1 & vibe-alarm feature thin, sleek, metal case, B&W HiRes screen (Japanese)
PEG-T415—English ROM version of the PEG-T400
PEG-T425—European version of T415
PEG-T600C—Palm OS 4.1 thin, sleek, metal case, Color HiRes screen (Japanese)
PEG-T615C—English ROM version of the PEG-T600
PEG-T625C—European version of T615C
PEG-T600C—Palm OS 4.1 & MP3 player thin, sleek, metal case, Color HiRes screen
PEG-T665C—English ROM version of the PEG-T650
PEG-T675C—European version of T665C

TG Series

PEG-TG50—Palm OS 5.0

TH Series

PEG-TH55—Palm OS 5.2.1 Wi-Fi (/E European versions also had Bluetooth)

TJ Series

PEG-TJ25—Palm OS 5.2
PEG-TJ27—Palm OS 5.2
PEG-TJ35—Palm OS 5.2
PEG-TJ37—Palm OS 5.2

UX Series

PEG-UX40—Palm OS 5.2 & MP3 player
PEG-UX50—Palm OS 5.2 & MP3 player

VZ Series

PEG-VZ90—Palm OS 5.2.1

Symbol
PDA with integrated barcode reader

SPT-1500—Palm OS 3.0.2r3
SPT-1550—Palm OS 3.0
SPT-1700—Palm OS 3.5
SPT-1733—Palm OS 3.5.2
SPT-1734—Palm OS 3.5.2
SPT-1740—Palm OS 3.5
SPT-1800—Palm OS 4.0
SPT-1833—Palm OS 4.0
SPT-1834—Palm OS 4.0
SPT-1846—Palm OS 4.0

Tapwave

A PDA designed for handheld gaming. It was held sideways (landscape), had an analog joystick and extra gaming buttons, and used Bluetooth for multiplayer gaming as well as standard PDA functions.  It also introduced a dedicated video chip, and dual SD card slots.

Tapwave Zodiac 1 -- Palm OS 5.2T & MP3 player
Tapwave Zodiac 2 -- Palm OS 5.2T & MP3 player

Oswin

Two models (candybar and slider) were demonstrated at PalmSource Euro Dev Con 2005 running Palm OS Cobalt 6.1.1 
A few were sold onsite. Oswin never produced more. These were the only Palm OS cobalt devices to be seen in the wild.
The codename for the candybar version was Zircon A108

Emulators
 POSE (Palm OS Emulator)—Free Palm OS 4 emulator for PCs
 Palm OS Simulator—Palm OS 5 simulator for PCs
 StyleTap—for Windows Mobile, Symbian, and Android 
 Garnet VM—for Access Linux Platform and Maemo
 Classic—for webOS-based Devices
 PHEM—for Android-based devices
 Cloudpilot—for web browsers and mobile devices

See also
List of Pocket PC Devices

References

External links
Palm family tree
Palm Infocenter list of all Palm OS PDA Reviews
Palm OS versions and upgrade possibility list - BAD LINK
Pen Computing Magazine Review of the TRG Pro
Palm OS

Palm OS devices
 
Palm OS